Hypostomus fonchii is a species of catfish in the family Loricariidae. It is native to South America, where it occurs in the Cushabatay River basin, which is itself part of the Ucayali River drainage in Peru, as well as the Mamoré River basin in Bolivia. It is typically found in clear, high-altitude waters with large rocks, dead leaves and wood, an absence of aquatic vegetation, and a substrate of sand, clay, or pebbles. The species reaches 15.4 cm (6.1 inches) SL.

References 

fonchii
Fish described in 2002